National Geographic Explorer is a small passenger vessel in the Lindblad Expeditions fleet. She can accommodate 148 guests. The ship is equipped with extra hull plating to withstand higher ice breaking tolerances. She was previously operated by Hurtigruten.

The ship frequently follows routes in the Antarctic, Arctic, Norway, Greenland, and Canadian Highlands.

History 
For some time since May 3, 2020 the ship was anchored outside of Frederikshavn due to the ongoing COVID-19 pandemic on cruise ships.

Facilities 

The ship has educational and entertainment facilities, including a chart room, library, observation lounge, a fleet of 36 kayaks, a remote operated vehicle capable of diving to 1000 feet depth, a fleet of 14 zodiacs, lounge and fitness center.

Accommodation
National Geographic Explorer offers 81 cabins and suites which are all outside facing.

References

Ships of Lindblad Expeditions
Ships built in Ulstein
1982 ships